The Assheton Baronetcy, of Middleton in the County of Lancaster, was created in the Baronetage of England on 17 August 1660 for Ralph Assheton. The second Baronet sat as Member of Parliament for Liverpool and Lancashire. The title became extinct on the death of the third Baronet in 1765.

Assheton baronets, of Middleton (1660)
Sir Ralph Assheton, 1st Baronet (1626–1665)
Sir Ralph Assheton, 2nd Baronet (1652–1716)
Sir Ralph Assheton, 3rd Baronet (died 1765)

See also
 Assheton baronets

Notes

Extinct baronetcies in the Baronetage of England
1660 establishments in England
1765 disestablishments in Great Britain